Jeffrey Thomas Pittman (born 1971) is an American politician. He is a Democrat representing the 5th district in the Kansas Senate. Prior to that, he was a member of the Kansas House of Representatives, representing the 41st district. Pittman ran for election to the Kansas State Senate to represent District 5. He won in the general election on November 3, 2020.

Political career 

Pittman was elected to represent District 41 in the Kansas House of Representatives in 2016, defeating incumbent Tony Barton. He was re-elected in 2018, again defeating Tony Barton.

Pittman defeated incumbent Republican Kevin Braun in the 2020 election to represent District 5 in the Kansas State Senate.

Electoral record

References 

Living people
Politicians from Leavenworth, Kansas
21st-century American politicians
Democratic Party members of the Kansas House of Representatives
Massachusetts Institute of Technology alumni
Alumni of the University of Oxford
1971 births
Democratic Party Kansas state senators